Police Bullets is a 1942 American crime film directed by Jean Yarbrough and written by Edmond Kelso and Ande Lamb. The film stars Joan Marsh, John Archer, Milburn Stone, Warren Hymer, Tris Coffin and Fern Emmett. The film was released by Monogram Pictures on September 25, 1942.

Plot

Cast          
Joan Marsh as Donna Wells
John Archer as Prof. J. Thomas Quincy
Milburn Stone as Johnny Reilly
Warren Hymer as Gabby Walsh
Tris Coffin as Slater
Fern Emmett as Mrs. Bowser
Ann Evers as Milly
Charles Judels as Duke Talbot
Pat Gleason as Louie Pozowicz
Gene O'Donnell as Monk
Charlie Hall as Rabbit
Billy Griffith as Professor Dinwiddle
Ben Taggart as W. A. Barlow
Irving Mitchell as Bob 'Pops' Wilson

References

External links
 

1942 films
1940s English-language films
American crime films
1942 crime films
Monogram Pictures films
Films directed by Jean Yarbrough
1940s American films